Lithocarpus melataiensis is a tree in the beech family Fagaceae. It is named for, and native to, Bukit Melatai mountain in Sarawak, Borneo.

Description
The flowers are solitary along the rachis.

Distribution and habitat
Lithocarpus melataiensis is endemic to Borneo, where it is confined to Sarawak. Its habitat is mixed dipterocarp forest from  altitude.

References

melataiensis
Endemic flora of Borneo
Flora of Sarawak
Plants described in 1998
Flora of the Borneo lowland rain forests